The A67 motorway is a motorway in the Netherlands. It is located in the Dutch provinces of North Brabant and Limburg.

Overview
The road is approximately 75 kilometer in length. The A67 motorway connects the Belgian border (A21/E34 road) near Hapert with Eindhoven and the German border (A40 road) near Venlo. Along the entire stretch of the motorway, the European route E34 travels along the A67. Besides, the section near Eindhoven, between interchanges De Hogt and Leenderheide, is shared with the A2 motorway and European route E25.

In the past, traffic from the Eindhoven area towards the German Autobahn A61 had to take exit 41, and then travel along local roads for approximately 7 kilometers before they reached the border and the start of the German A61. Since 4 April 2012, a connection between the Dutch A73 and the German A61 is in operation (the A74), which gives drivers the possibility to travel between the Dutch A67 and the German A61 without having to leave the motorway.

Exit list

External links

Motorways in the Netherlands
Motorways in Limburg (Netherlands)
Motorways in North Brabant
Transport in Eindhoven
Transport in Venlo
Bladel